In mathematics, and particularly general topology, the half-disk topology is an example of a topology given to the set , given by all points  in the plane such that . The set  can be termed the closed upper half plane.

 The union of open sets is an open set.
 The finite intersection of open sets is an open set.
 The set  and the empty set  are open sets.

Construction  

We consider  to consist of the open upper half plane , given by all points  in the plane such that ; and the x-axis , given by all points  in the plane such that . Clearly  is given by the union . The open upper half plane  has a topology given by the Euclidean metric topology.

See also 

 List of topologies

References 

General topology
Topological spaces